Paczyński is a surname. Notable people with the surname include: 

Bohdan Paczyński (1940–2007), Polish astronomer
Paczyński–Wiita potential
Józef Paczyński (1920–2015), Polish barber

Polish-language surnames